The Pleasure and the Greed is the second studio album by Canadian-American rock band Big Wreck and the last released before their break-up. In April 2001, the band made seven songs from the album available for download on their website. On April 30, the band released the lead single from the album, "Inhale", which achieved notable radio airplay in Canada. Songs "Ladylike" and "Knee Deep" were also released as singles and music videos were released for each of them. The song "Breakthrough" features Myles Kennedy, the now-former frontman for The Mayfield Four and the current frontman for Alter Bridge. The album was released on June 5, 2001 and debuted at #10 on the Canadian Albums Chart, selling 7,408 copies in its first week.

Nickelback has covered Mistake many times in the past including appearing on the Live at Home film but is commonly mistaken as an original Nickelback songs amongst fans.

Track listing

Produced by Dave Jerden except tracks 1, 3, 8, and 12 produced by John Whynot and Ian Thornley.

Personnel
Ian Thornley — lead guitar, vocals, keyboards
Brian Doherty — rhythm guitar
David Henning — bass
Forrest Williams — drums

Covers
Nickelback has covered the song "Mistake" live, including on their DVD Live at Home.

References

2001 albums
Big Wreck albums
Albums produced by Dave Jerden